Edwardsina tasmaniensis or the Tasmanian torrent midge is a species of fly in family Blephariceridae. It is endemic to Australia. As their name suggests, they make their homes in the fastest-flowing parts of rivers and streams of Tasmania.

References

External links

Blephariceridae
Insects of Australia
Critically endangered fauna of Australia
Critically endangered insects
Insects described in 1924
Taxonomy articles created by Polbot